"Ghetto Day" and "What I Need" are two songs by American singer-songwriter Crystal Waters, issued as a double A-side in June 1994 as the second single from her second studio album, Storyteller (1994). It was produced by the Basement Boys and released by Mercury Records, A&M Records and A&M's division AM PM. Waters and Sean Spencer wrote "Ghetto Day", which is a funk song that contains samples from The 5th Dimension's song "Stoned Soul Picnic" and Flavor Unit's "Flavor Unit Assassination Squad". According to Spin, the track's lyrics talk about "those balmy, front-stoop, 40-swinging summer afternoons." The single's second A-side, "What I Need", is a house track written by Waters, Doug Smith and Richard Payton.

Contemporary critics complimented both songs and noted them as the album's highlights. Commercially, the joint release entered the top forty in the United Kingdom. "What I Need" was released separately in October 1994 and later became Waters' fourth single to top the US Billboard Dance Club Songs Chart. It also reached the top spot of the Bubbling Under Hot 100 and  82 of the Billboard Hot 100. In other media, "What I Need" was featured in the film Double Dragon (1994) and an episode of television series So You Think You Can Dance Canada.

Compositions
Like the majority of songs on Storyteller (1994), both "Ghetto Day" and "What I Need" were produced, arranged and mixed by the Basement Boys, with Waters credited as their main writer. Additionally, Sean Spencer co-wrote the former track, and Doug Smith and Richard Payton co-wrote the latter.

Musically, "Ghetto Day" is a mid-tempo funk, hip hop and doo-wop track that has an "easy flow" and a "gently funky conversation" where Waters "opens up." Larry Flick of Billboard described the song as a "splash of cool retro-funk that is laced with licks" from its sampling of The 5th Dimension's "Stoned Soul Picnic". It also contains portions of Flavor Unit's 1996 track "Flavor Unit Assassination Squad". According to Jonathan Bernstein from Spin, the lyrical content of "Ghetto Day" "rhapsodizes about those balmy, front-stoop, 40-swinging summer afternoons." Charles Aaron from the same publication wrote of the lyrics: "Going home, she listens to Grandma talk to the Lord, babies scream, old men go tra-la-la, and her brother sing the praises of a 40-ounce on a sunny day."

On the other hand, "What I Need" was described as a house piece and one of the album's "jovial, upbeat" moments, where Waters performed her vocal in a "sick, tired, and simmering" manner.

Reception

Critical reviews
Peter Galvin of The Advocate stated that "Ghetto Day" was "more listener-friendly" than the other songs on the album, with lyrics that offered "a paradisaical view of life and love in the slums, made convincing by the use of a sample from Fifth Dimension's summery 'Stoned Soul Picnic'." A reviewer from Billboard called it "a languid, liquid sketch of a lazy city afternoon", and noted that "it gets the nod as [the album's] likeliest knockout contender." M.R. Martinez from Cash Box noted that she "goes for the "La Dee Da" with the optimistic “Ghetto Day”, with its “tra-la-la-la” refrain." Also Fred DeUar of High Fidelity News and Record Review praised the sampling of 'Stoned Soul Picnic', stating that it was done "in the cause of better-class '90s pop." Ernest Hardy from the Los Angeles Times called "Ghetto Day" a "sugary, hip hop, doo-wop inner-city fantasy". Andy Beevers from Music Week gave it four out of five, calling it "a breezy and funky mid-tempo song, purpose-made for radio play on a Summer afternoon." James Hamilton from the RM Dance Update deemed it a "radio aimed gorgeous gentle 90bpm summery hip hop soul" track. Michael Wilson from Rolling Stone viewed it as a "driving throwback" to '70s soul, where "Waters croons over a backbeat of choppy rhythm guitar and drums to evoke hot days on the streets." Spin Charles Aaron thought it was "a more sublime sound than any arm-twisting remix", while Jonathan Bernstein described it as "languid" and one of the "noteworthy" Storyteller tracks.

Ron Wynn from AllMusic declared "What I Need" one of the album's best. Billboard Larry Flick labelled it a "floor-filler" and an "upbeat rouser." Another reviewer from the same publication thought "What I Need" was one of the hits to be had from Storyteller. Vibe magazine stated "What I Need" and "100% Pure Love", the album's first single, "ooze with giddy abandon—not to mention juicy grooves that seep deeper into the brain and body upon repeated spins." "What I Need" was claimed by Spin Bernstein to have "xeroxed" Clivillés and Cole's 1991 single "A Deeper Love". However, he predicted that it could have been a potential successor to her previous signature hits, "Gypsy Woman" and "Makin' Happy".

Commercial performance
"Ghetto Day" and "What I Need" were released as a double A-side single on June 20, 1994. The joint release peaked at  40 on the UK Singles Chart and at No. 94 on the ARIA Top 100 Singles Chart. In October 1994, Mercury Records released "What I Need" separately, and later sent the track to contemporary hit radios in January 1995. It eventually gained Waters her fourth No. 1 single on the Billboard Dance Club Songs Chart of November 5, 1994. On the chart's year-end edition of 1994, it peaked at No. 42. The song also topped the Bubbling Under Hot 100 before reaching No. 82 of the Billboard Hot 100. However, the latter entry was the singer's lowest peak on the chart. "What I Need" also climbed to No. 7 on the Hot Dance Music/Maxi-Singles Sales and No. 32 on the Top 40 Airplay Rhythm-Crossover.

Promotion and other usages
The music video for "Ghetto Day" marked Waters' second work with German director Marcus Nispel, following "100% Pure Love". It shows the singer performing around an African-American neighborhood, with scenes tinted in a yellow-orange tone. Pam Thomas directed the video for "What I Need", which consists of scenes of Waters shot primarily in a bathroom. BET added the clips to the channel's playlist in late August 1994 and early March 1995, respectively.

Waters performed "Ghetto Day" on the June 30, 1994, episode of British music-chart television programme Top of the Pops. "100% Pure Love" and "What I Need" were subsequently featured in the 1994 action film Double Dragon, but only the latter was included on its soundtrack album. During the fourth season of So You Think You Can Dance Canada, two contestants—JP Dubé and Geisha Chin—performed "What I Need" on its twelfth episode which aired on August 1, 2011.

Formats and track listings

"Ghetto Day" / "What I Need"
 Australia, Europe and UK maxi single; international 12-inch single

 "Ghetto Day"  – 3:20
 "What I Need"  – 10:35
 "What I Need"  – 8:45

 UK 7-inch and cassette single
 "Ghetto Day"  – 3:20
 "What I Need"  – 10:35

"What I Need"
 Canada maxi single
 "What I Need"  – 3:14
 "What I Need"  – 8:16
 "What I Need"  – 4:18
 "What I Need"  – 10:35
 "What I Need"  – 6:55
 "100% Pure Love"  – 9:29

 France CD single
 "What I Need"  – 3:14
 "What I Need"  – 3:29

 Germany remix maxi single
 "What I Need"  – 6:55
 "100% Pure Love"  – 9:29
 "Gypsy Woman (La Da Dee)"  – 7:32

 Italy and US 12-inch single
 "What I Need"  – 6:55
 "What I Need"  – 5:11
 "What I Need"  – 8:16
 "100% Pure Love"  – 9:29

 UK and US maxi single
 "What I Need"  – 3:14
 "What I Need"  – 3:29
 "What I Need"  – 3:47
 "What I Need"  – 3:53

 US 12-inch single
 "What I Need"  – 8:16
 "What I Need"  – 4:18
 "What I Need"  – 10:35
 "Ghetto Day"  – 3:32

 US cassette single
 "What I Need"  – 4:12
 "Ghetto Day"  – 3:32

Credits
Credits are adapted from the liner notes of Storyteller.

Recording and management
 Recorded at Basement Boys Studios (Baltimore)
 Mastered by Herb "The Pump" Powers at The Hit Factory (New York City)
 "Ghetto Day" contains portions of "Stoned Soul Picnic", written by Laura Nyro and performed by The 5th Dimension, published by EMI Music (BMI), and "Flavor Unit Assassination Squad" by the Flavor Unit, published by Tuff City Music
 Managed by Vito Bruno for AM/PM Entertainment

Personnel for "Ghetto Day"
 Teddy Douglas – production, vocal production, arrangement, engineering, mixing
 Jay Steinhour – production, arrangement, mixing, engineering
 Crystal Waters – vocal, writing, background vocal
 Sean Spencer – writing, drums
 Eric "Moe" Rosenberg – editing
 Gerry Brown – engineering, mixing
 Brian "G" – engineering (tracking)
 Gerry E. Brown – mixing
 Gary Hudgins – keyboards
 Hoza Clowney – keyboards 
 Kenny Hicks – background vocal, vocal production, vocal arrangement 
 Audrey Wheeler – background vocal
 DJ Noodles – scratching
 Wayne Cooper – guitar
 P Funk Horn Section – live horns

Personnel for "What I Need"
 Teddy Douglas – production, arrangement, mixing, drums, engineering (tracking)
 Jay Steinhour – production, arrangement, mixing, drums
 Crystal Waters – vocal, writing
 Doug Smith – writing, keyboards, drums
 Richard Payton – writing, drums, keyboards
 Eric "Moe" Rosenberg – editing
 95 North – mixing
 David Sussman – engineering
 Greg Thomas – background vocal
 Novelair Thomas – background vocal
 Greg Boyer – trombone

Charts

Weekly charts

Year-end charts

See also
 List of number-one dance singles of 1994 (U.S.)

References

1994 singles
1994 songs
Crystal Waters songs
Mercury Records singles
A&M Records singles
AM PM Records singles
Music videos directed by Marcus Nispel
Funk songs
American hip hop songs